Rafał Augustyn (born August 28, 1951 in Wrocław, Poland) is a composer of classical music, and a pianist, music critic, writer and scholar of Polish philology. As a composer he has written symphonies, chamber orchestra works, vocal and electronic music, as well as music for theatre. Since the mid-1990s, Augustyn has collaborated with visual artists, architects and photographers on numerous multimedia art works.

Education and career
Augustyn studied composition under Ryszard Bukowski at the State Higher School of Music in Wrocław between 1971–74, and between 1975–77 at the State Higher School of Music in Katowice, where he studied under Henryk Górecki. In 1979, Augustyn began to teach at the Institute of Polish Philology at Wrocław University and has remained there since. His works have had numerous performances at the Warsaw Autumn Festival, as well as at other Polish festivals, and across Europe, North America and the Far East. As a music writer and critic he has written for such journals and periodicals as Ruch Muzyczny and Odra.

As a music critic, he has also published reviews in music and literary press as well as appearing on the Polish Radio and Television. In 1984-94, together with Marek Pijarowski, he was director of the "Musica Polonica Nova" Festival of Polish Contemporary Music in Wrocław. In 1980-98 he was a member of the Repertoire Committee of the "Warsaw Autumn" International Festival of Contemporary Music. He was co-founder of the "Brevis" Music Publishers.

Style
Along with Andrzej Krzanowski and Eugeniusz Knapik, Augustyn is sometimes included as a member of the so-called "Silesian School"; that is, a group of composers who studied under Górecki in Katowice, Silesia, and are noted for their break with the current dominant postmodernist approach to classical music in Poland.

One of his major pieces, his "Symphony of Hymns", took 20 years to complete, typically lasts for 100 minutes and requires an orchestra of over 170 players. It was described in 2004 by the music critic Tim Rutherford-Johnson as,
"a monster of a work....[but] has that broad sweeping feel of neo-Romanticism that one might expect from a contemporary Polish symphonist, although it features none of Górecki’s direct simplicity, or Penderecki’s gloomy ponderousness. It does however...continually blur the line between orchestration and form. Melody and harmony are present, but not discernible as such; more important is a lilting shifting of colours that tumbles the music forward."

Selected works

Citations

Bibliography
 Adrian, Thomas. "Augustyn Rafał". In: The New Grove Dictionary of Music and Musicians. Second Edition, volume 2. London: Macmillan Publishers Limited, 2001.
 Bauman, Jolanta. "Charakterystyka sylwetki twórczej Rafała Augustyna (Rafał Augustyn’s artistic individuality)". In: Research conference on the topic of "The Work of Wrocław Composers (1945-1985)". Wrocław: Akademia Muzyczna we Wrocławiu, 1990.
 Zduniak, Maria. "Augustyn Rafał". In: Encyklopedia Muzyczna PWM. Kraków: PWM, 1998.

20th-century classical composers
Polish composers
21st-century classical composers
1951 births
Living people
Polish male classical composers
20th-century male musicians
21st-century male musicians